Los Vaqueros Tour is the second concert tour by reggaeton duo Wisin & Yandel to support their album Los Vaqueros. The tour consisted of a series of concerts and festivals in Latin America and included the concert titled "La Triologia del genero" with reggaeton superstar Don Omar and had the highest attendance for a reggaeton concert at the time with around 80,000 fans.

Tour dates

Notes

References 

Concert tours
Reggaeton articles
Latin music